Miroslav Stojanovski (born 10 July 1959 in Skopje) is a Macedonian military officer who holds the rank of lieutenant general and was the longest-serving Chief of General Staff of the Army of the Republic of Macedonia (2005–2011).

In 2013 he was appointed as the Macedonian military attache to NATO and the EU.

Military career 
Positions:
Commander of a military police platoon (1982–1984)
Commander of the Military Police (1984–1989)
Commander of counterterrorism regiment (1989–1991)
Deputy Commander of Military Police Battalion (1991–1992)
Head of Department of Military Police Department of Intelligence and Security in the Ministry of Defense (1992–1994)
Commander of the Unit for Special Purposes, Ministry of Defense (1994–1998)
General Staff Officer (1998-1999)
Deputy Chief of the Department for Strategic Research Staff (1999–2000)
Head of the Department of Physical Education in Military Academy (2000–2001)
Commander of 1st Mechanized Infantry Brigade (2001–2003)
Deputy Chief of Staff for operations (2003–2005)
Chief of the General Staff of the Army of the Republic of Macedonia (2005-2011)
Ranks:
Junior Lieutenant (1982)
Lieutenant (1983)
Captain (1986)
Captain 1st Class (1990)
Major (1991)
Lieutenant Colonel (1994)
Colonel (1998)
Brigadier General (2001)
Major General (2003)
Lieutenant General (2006)

References 
http://news.bbc.co.uk/2/hi/europe/4472382.stm

Sources 
Macedonian Wikipedia
Ministry of Defense of the Republic of Macedonia

Military personnel from Skopje
Yugoslav People's Army personnel
Army of North Macedonia personnel
1959 births
[[Category:Living peoplehttps://www.youtube.com/watch?v=G0YDXRxDDqw